Warrendale is a northern suburb of Pittsburgh, Pennsylvania, United States. It is located in the northwestern corner of Allegheny County. It is the home to the corporate headquarters of rue21, Joy Mining Machinery, Printing Industries of America and SAE International, as well as the United States Postal Service Pittsburgh Network Distribution Center, one of 21 such mail delivery hubs in the country. It is also the home to one of American Eagle Outfitters' four North American distribution centers.

References

Coal towns in Pennsylvania
Unincorporated communities in Allegheny County, Pennsylvania
Unincorporated communities in Pennsylvania